is a song by Japanese singer-songwriter Rina Aiuchi. It was released on 4 May 2005 through Giza Studio, as the lead single from her fifth studio album Delight. The song reached number seven in Japan and has sold over 21,854 copies nationwide. The song served as the theme song to the Japanese tokusatsu television series, Ultraman Nexus.

Track listing

Charts

Weekly charts

Certification and sales

|-
! scope="row"| Japan (RIAJ)
| 
| 21,854
|-
|}

Release history

References

2005 singles
2005 songs
J-pop songs
Song recordings produced by Daiko Nagato
Songs written by Rina Aiuchi